Stanko Despot (9 April 1928 – 8 January 2002) was a Croatian rower. He was born in Sibenik, Croatia (at the time Yugoslavia) in 1928 and died in 2002.

Career 
He competed in the men's eight event at the 1952 Summer Olympics.

References

1928 births
2002 deaths
Croatian male rowers
Olympic rowers of Yugoslavia
Rowers at the 1952 Summer Olympics
Sportspeople from Šibenik